James Kiberd (born July 6, 1949 in Providence, Rhode Island) is an American actor.

He played Trevor Dillon on the soap opera All My Children from 1989 to 2000. A popular character from the beginning, he was paired in relationships with the character Natalie Marlowe (Kate Collins), Laurel Banning (Felicity LaFortune) and later, Natalie's nutty twin sister Janet Green (played also by Kate Collins, later by Robin Mattson).  He was the uncle of Hayley Vaughn (Kelly Ripa); for years, Hayley lovingly called him "Uncle Porkchop," while he affectionately referred to her as "Tinkerbell."

"The Book of Lists: The 90's Edition " by Wallace and Wallechinsky cites him as #11 between Tim Allen#10 and Steve Martin#12 in the "15 Top Celebrity Q Scores".

His other Soap opera credits include Another World and Loving. He has been married since 1986 to soap actress Susan Keith, whom he met on the set of Loving (she played core character Shana Sloane on the show for many years).

In 2001, Kiberd filled in for Benjamin Hendrickson in the role of Hal Munson on As the World Turns while he was away on urgent family business.

Since  2001 Kiberd  has performed primarily on stage and in film. Of the dozen Shakespeare roles he has performed, his "Petruchio" won the best actor "Zoni" in 2004. He stars as Elliot in the film "Soldier's Heart" which had its world premier at the GI Film Festival in Washington D.C. on May 18, 2008; winning for best narrative film.

He was awarded "The Meyer Schapiro Artist Award " at Augusta State University in 1999 and the publication of "James Kiberd Drawings"  accompanied the exhibit there.

Recipient of the 1994  Danny Kaye Humanitarian Award in recognition of his visionary advocacy on behalf of children worldwide,
Kiberd was appointed a UNICEF Goodwill Ambassador for the United States in 1995.

References

American male soap opera actors
1949 births
Living people